Anolis sabanus, the Saba anole or Saban anole, is a species of anole lizard that is endemic to the island of Saba, a Dutch municipality in the Caribbean Lesser Antilles.

Males and females both have pale grey to tan colored bodies and pale yellow with green or orange tint dewlaps, but the males can be differentiated by additional dark patches covering their bodies. Females additionally have a mid-dorsal stripe. The species eats mostly small insects. While the species is rare by being endemic (only found on the island of Saba), it is very common on the island.

Biologists believe the origin of the species may come from Saint Croix, and that it is older than the present-day anoles found on Sint Eustatius, Saint Martin and Saint Kitts. Within the bimaculatus series, it belongs to the Guadeloupean-Dominican clade of anoles, which includes A. marmoratus on the Guadeloupe Archipelago, A. lividus on Montserrat, A. nubilus on Redonda, and A. oculatus on Dominica.

See also
List of amphibians and reptiles of Saba

References

External links

Anolis sabanus at the Encyclopedia of Life
Anolis sabanus at the Reptile Database

Anoles
Lizards of the Caribbean
Endemic fauna of Saba
Reptiles described in 1887
Taxa named by Samuel Garman